Guido Ubaldus may refer to:

Guidobaldo del Monte (1545–1607), Italian mathematician and astronomer, friend of Galileo
Luigi Guido Grandi (1671–1742), Italian priest and mathematician, best known for the rose curve and Grandi's series